The Canada Games is a multi-sport event held every two years, alternating between the Canada Winter Games and the Canada Summer Games. They represent the highest level of national competition for Canadian athletes. Two separate programs are organized in order to cover the seasons of summer and winter: the Canada Summer Games (CSG) and the Canada Winter Games (CWG). Athlete age eligibility rules vary.

The first ever edition of the Canada Winter Games was the 1967 Canada Winter Games, marking the beginning of this important sporting event for Canadians. It has since become an integral part of celebrating Canadian talent for young amateur Canadian athletes focused on winter sports. The most recent Canada Winter Games was the PEI 2023 Canada Winter Games which ran from February 18 – March 5, 2023 in the province of Prince Edward Island. 

The first ever edition of the Canada Summer Games was the 1969 Canada Summer Games. The most recent Canada Summer Games was the 2022 Canada Summer Games which took place August 6–21, 2022 in the Niagara Region. The next Canada Summer Games, the 2025 Canada Summer Games, will be hosted in St. John's, Newfoundland and Labrador. St. John's Newfoundland and Labrador was named the Host Society of the 2025 Canada Summer Games as of April 22, 2021. The host cities have not been chosen for the games after 2025 but the provinces through 2035 have been selected.

History 
The Games were first held in 1967 in Quebec City as part of Canada's Centennial celebrations. For the first time in Canada's history, 1,800 athletes from 10 provinces and two territories gathered to compete in 15 sports. Since 1967, over 75,000 athletes have participated in the Games. The Games have been hosted in every province at least once since their inception in Quebec City during Canada’s Centennial in 1967. Journalist Eddie MacCabe wrote a history book for the 25th anniversary of the Canada Games in 1992.

Facility development

Sports
Over the course of the history of the Canada Games, a variety of sports have been added and dropped at various points within the Summer Games and Winter Games programs. The winter games include some sports not associated with winter.

Former sports
Fencing was previously a Winter Games sport before it was moved to Summer program for the Sherbrooke 2013 games and then removed altogether following those games. BMX, field hockey, and water polo were formerly in the Summer program as well.

Returning sports
Fencing made its return to the Games during the 2023 Canada Winter Games in Prince Edward Island. Its last appearance had been during the 2013 Canada Summer Games.

Box lacrosse made its return to the Summer Games during the 2022 Canada Summer Games. It was the first time box lacrosse had been featured since the 1985 Canada Games.

Organization
The games are governed by the Canada Games Council, a private, non-profit organization. As the Games move from one host community to the next, the Council provides the continuity, leadership and support to Host Societies in key areas such as sport technical, organizational planning, ceremonies and protocol, marketing and sponsorship. In addition, the Canada Games Council ensures effective long-term partnerships with national sport organizations, governments and the corporate sector. The Canada Games Council is a well-established, national organization that fosters on-going partnerships with organizations at the municipal, provincial and national levels.

Host Society 

The individual games are run by the local Host Society, a non-profit private organization that is established 2–4 years prior to the event. The Host Society functions in accordance with an agreement between the Canada Games Council, the government of Canada, the government of the province or territory and the government of the municipality. The Canada Games Council maintains and secures long-term partnership agreements with governments, corporations and national sport organizations.

Funding 

Funding for the games comes from the several levels of government together with donations and corporate sponsorships. A considerable portion of the work during the games is performed by local volunteers.

Hosts 
The host cities have not been chosen for the games after 2025, but the provinces through 2037 have.

Summer

The 2022 Canada Games were scheduled to be held in 2021, but were rescheduled to 2022 due to the COVID-19 pandemic.

Winter

Host provinces/territories

Map of host cities

All-time medal tables 
For Games medal standings see List of Canada Games.

Medal leaders by year 
Canada Summer Games medal table leaders by year:

 1969: 
 1973: 
 1977: 
 1981: 
 1985: 
 1989: 
 1993: 
 1997: 
 2001: 
 2005: 
 2009: 
 2013: 
 2017: 
 2022: 

Canada Winter Games medal table leaders by year:

 1967: 
 1971: 
 1975: 
 1979: 
 1983: 
 1987: 
 1991: 
 1995: 
 1999: 
 2003: 
 2007: 
 2011: 
 2015: 
 2019: 

Number of occurrences:
  – 16 times (13 Summer; 3 Winter)
  – 11 times (11 Winter)
  – 1 time (1 Summer)

See also

 BC Games
BC Summer Games
BC Winter Games
Western Canada Summer Games
Alberta Winter Games
Saskatchewan Games
Saskatchewan Summer Games
Saskatchewan Winter Games
Manitoba Games
Ontario Games
Quebec Games

References

External links
Official site

 
1967 establishments in Canada
Multi-sport events in Canada
National multi-sport events
Recurring sporting events established in 1967
Biennial sporting events